11 (eleven) is the natural number following 10 and preceding 12. It is the first repdigit. In English, it is the smallest positive integer whose name has three syllables.

Name
"Eleven" derives from the Old English , which is first attested in Bede's late 9th-century Ecclesiastical History of the English People. It is sometimes compared with the Lithuanian , though  is used as the suffix for all numbers from 11 to 19 (analogously to "-teen").

In English, "eleven" is the only two-digit number that does not contain the letter T.

In languages

In mathematics
Eleven is the fifth prime number, and the first two-digit numeric palindrome in decimal. The next prime number is 13, with which it comprises a twin prime. 11 is the first repunit prime (it is the first repunit of any kind), the first strong prime, the second unique prime, the second good prime, the third super-prime, the fourth Lucas prime, and the fifth supersingular prime.

It is also the third member of the first prime quadruplet, 

11 is a Heegner number, meaning that the ring of integers of the field  has the property of unique factorization. As a consequence, there exists at most one point on the elliptic curve  that has positive-integer coordinates. In this case, this unique point is (15, 58).

There are 11 orthogonal curvilinear coordinate systems (to within a conformal symmetry) in which the 3-variable Helmholtz equation can be solved using the separation of variables technique.

The rows of Pascal's triangle can be seen as representation of the powers of 11. 

11 of 35 hexominoes can fold in a net to form a cube, while 11 of 66 octiamonds can fold into a regular octahedron.

An 11-sided polygon is called a hendecagon, or undecagon. The complete graph  has a total of 55 edges, which collectively represent the diagonals and sides of a hendecagon. 

A regular hendecagon cannot be constructed with a compass and straightedge alone, as 11 is not a product of distinct Fermat primes, and it is also the first polygon that is not able to be constructed with the aid of an angle trisector. 

11 and some of its multiples appear as counts of uniform tessellations in various dimensions and spaces; there are:

 11 regular and semiregular convex uniform tilings in the Euclidean plane, which are dual to the 11 Laves tilings. 
 22 edge-to-edge uniform tilings with convex and star polygons, and 33 uniform tilings with zizgzag apeirogons that alternate between two angles.  
 11 regular paracompact hyperbolic honeycombs with infinite facets and vertex figures in the third dimension.
 11 total regular hyperbolic honeycombs in the fourth dimension: 9 compact solutions are generated from regular 4-polytopes and regular star 4-polytopes, alongside 2 paracompact solutions.
 55 uniform Euclidean 4-honeycombs exist in the fourth dimension, and 66 uniform Euclidean 5-honeycombs exist in the fifth dimension. 

The 11-cell is a self-dual abstract 4-polytope with 11 vertices, 55 edges, 55 triangular faces, and 11 hemi-icosahedral cells. It is universal in the sense that it is the only abstract polytope with hemi-icosahedral facets and hemi-dodecahedral vertex figures. The 11-cell contains the same number of vertices and edges as the complete graph  and the 10-simplex, a regular polytope in 10 dimensions.

The first eleven prime numbers (from 2 through 31) are consecutive supersingular primes that divide the order of the friendly giant, with the remaining four supersingular primes (41, 47, 59, and 71) lying between five non-supersingular primes. Only five of twenty-six sporadic groups do not contain 11 as a prime factor that divides their group order (and ). 11 is also not a prime factor of the order of the Tits group , which is sometimes categorized as non-strict group of Lie type, or sporadic group. 

In particular, Mathieu group  is the smallest sporadic group, defined as the sharply 4-transitive permutation group on eleven objects. It has order , with 11 as its largest prime factor, and a minimal faithful complex representation in ten dimensions. Its group action is the automorphism group of Steiner system , with an induced action on unordered pairs of points that gives a rank 3 action on 55 points.

In decimal 
11 is the smallest two-digit prime number. On the seven-segment display of a calculator, it is both a strobogrammatic prime and a dihedral prime.

Multiples of 11 by one-digit numbers yield palindromic numbers with matching double digits: 00, 11, 22, 33, 44, etc.

The sum of the first 11 non-zero positive integers, equivalently the 11th triangular number, is 66. On the other hand, the sum of the first 11 integers, from zero to ten, is 55.

The first four powers of 11 yield palindromic numbers: 111 = 11, 112 = 121, 113 = 1331, and 114 = 14641.

The factorial of 11, has about a 0.2% difference to the round number , or 40 million. Among the first 100 factorials, the next closest to a round number is 96, which is about 0.8% less than 10149.

If a number is divisible by 11, reversing its digits will result in another multiple of 11. As long as no two adjacent digits of a number added together exceed 9, then multiplying the number by 11, reversing the digits of the product, and dividing that new number by 11 will yield a number that is the reverse of the original number; as in:
 
142,312 × 11 = 1,565,432 → 2,345,651 ÷ 11 = 213,241.

Divisibility tests 
A simple test to determine whether an integer is divisible by 11 is to take every digit of the number in an odd position and add them, then take the remaining digits and add them. If the difference between the two sums is a multiple of 11, including 0, then the number is divisible by 11. For instance, with the number 65,637:

This technique also works with groups of digits rather than individual digits, so long as the number of digits in each group is odd, although not all groups have to have the same number of digits. If one uses three digits in each group, one gets from 65,637 the calculation,

Another test for divisibility is to separate a number into groups of two consecutive digits (adding a leading zero if there is an odd number of digits), and then add the numbers so formed; if the result is divisible by 11, the number is divisible by 11:

This also works by adding a trailing zero instead of a leading one, and with larger groups of digits, provided that each group has an even number of digits (not all groups have to have the same number of digits):

Multiplying 11 
An easy way to multiply numbers by 11 in base 10 is: 

If the number has:
1 digit, replicate the digit: 2 × 11 becomes 22.
2 digits, add the 2 digits and place the result in the middle: 47 × 11 becomes 4 (11) 7 or 4 (10+1) 7 or (4+1) 1 7 or 517.
3 digits, keep the first digit in its place for the result's first digit, add the first and second digits to form the result's second digit, add the second and third digits to form the result's third digit, and keep the third digit as the result's fourth digit. For any resulting numbers greater than 9, carry the 1 to the left.  123 × 11 becomes 1 (1+2) (2+3) 3 or 1353.  481 × 11 becomes 4 (4+8) (8+1) 1 or 4 (10+2) 9 1 or (4+1) 2 9 1 or 5291.
4 or more digits, follow the same pattern as for 3 digits.

List of basic calculations

In other bases 
In base 13 and higher bases (such as hexadecimal), 11 is represented as B, where ten is A. In duodecimal, 11 is sometimes represented as E or ↋, and ten as T, X, or ↊.

In science

11 is the atomic number of the element sodium.
In chemistry, Group 11 of the Periodic Table of the Elements (IUPAC numbering) consists of the three coinage metals copper, silver, and gold known from antiquity, and roentgenium, a recently synthesized superheavy element.
The number of spacetime dimensions in M-theory.

Astronomy

Apollo 11 was the first crewed spacecraft to land on the Moon.
A sunspot cycle's periodicity is approximately 11 years.
Messier object M11 is a magnitude 7.0 open cluster in the constellation Scutum, also known as the Wild Duck Cluster.
The New General Catalogue object NGC 11 is a spiral galaxy in the constellation Andromeda. 
The 11th moon of Jupiter is Himalia.

In religion and spirituality

Christianity
After Judas Iscariot was disgraced, Jesus's remaining apostles were sometimes called "the Eleven" (and ), even after Matthias was added to bring the number back to 12, as in Acts 2:14: Peter stood up with the eleven (New International Version). The New Living Translation says Peter stepped forward with the eleven other apostles, making clear that the number of apostles was now 12.

Saint Ursula is said to have been martyred in the 3rd or 4th century in Cologne with a number of companions, whose reported number "varies from five to eleven". A legend that Ursula died with 11,000 virgin companions has been thought to appear from misreading XI. M. V. (Latin abbreviation for "Eleven martyr virgins") as "Eleven thousand virgins".

Babylonian
In the Enûma Eliš the goddess Tiamat creates 11 monsters to avenge the death of her husband, Apsû.

Mysticism
The number 11 (alongside its multiples 22 and 33) are master numbers in numerology, especially in New Age. In astrology, Aquarius is the 11th astrological sign of the Zodiac.

In music

The interval of an octave plus a fourth is an 11th. A complete 11th chord has almost every note of a diatonic scale.
There are 11 thumb keys on a bassoon, not counting the whisper key. (A few bassoons have a 12th thumb key.)
In the mockumentary This Is Spinal Tap, Spinal Tap's amplifiers go up to eleven.
In Igor Stravinsky's The Rite of Spring, there are 11 consecutive repetitions of the same chord.
In Tool's song "Jimmy" and in Negativland's song "Time Zones", the number 11 appears repeatedly in the lyrics.
 "Eleven pipers piping" is the gift on the 11th day of Christmas in the carol "The Twelve Days of Christmas."
In Green Grow the Rushes, O, Eleven is for "the eleven who went to heaven."
"The Eleven" is a song by The Grateful Dead.
In "Time Enough For Rocking When We're Old" by The Magnetic Fields, a lyric references "when our pheromones go up to eleven."
Eleven Records is the record label of Jason Webley, and many of Webley's works feature the number 11.
 Eleven is the title of albums by:
Come
 incognito
 Martina McBride
 22-Pistepirkko
 Eleven
 Harry Connick Jr.
 Tina Arena
 Jeff Lorber and Mike Stern
 Reamonn
 Wagon Cookin'
 Mr. Fogg
 The Birdland Big Band
 Pearl Django
 Daniel Peña
 The Knux
 Igor Lumpert
 The Smithereens

In sports
 There are 11 players on an association football (soccer) team on the field at a time. 
 An American football team also has 11 players on the field at one time during play. #11 is worn by quarterbacks, kickers, punters and wide receivers as well as running backs, defensive backs, safeties and linebackers in American football's NFL.
 There are 11 players on a bandy team on the ice at a time. 
 In cricket, a team has 11 players on the field. The 11th player is usually the weakest batsman, at the tail-end. He is primarily in the team for his bowling abilities.
 There are 11 players in a field hockey team. The player wearing 11 will usually play on the left side, as in soccer.
 In most rugby league competitions (but not the Super League, which uses static squad numbering), one of the starting second-row forwards wears the number 11.
 In rugby union, the starting left wing wears number 11.

In the military

The number of guns in a gun salute to U.S. Army, Air Force and Marine Corps Brigadier Generals, and to Navy and Coast Guard Rear Admirals Lower Half.
The Military Occupational Specialty (MOS) designator given to US Army Infantry Officer as well as to enlisted personnel (AKA 11 MOS Series, or 11B, 11C, 11D, 11H, 11M, etc.)
The number of General Orders for Sentries in the Marine Corps and United States Navy.
A page in the Service Record Book of an enlisted Marine for writing down disciplinary actions.
World War I ended with an Armistice on November 11, 1918, which went into effect at 11:00 am—the 11th hour on the 11th day of the 11th month of the year. Armistice Day is still observed on November 11 of each year, although it is now called Veterans Day in the U.S. and Remembrance Day in the Commonwealth of Nations and parts of Europe.

In computing

 In Mozilla Firefox, Opera, Konqueror for KDE, Google Chrome and Internet Explorer for Windows, the function key F11 key toggles full-screen viewing mode. In macOS, F11 hides all open windows.
 The windowing system for Unix computers is X11.
 Computers of the PDP-11 series from Digital Equipment Corporation were informally called "elevens".
 Windows 11

In Canada
 The stylized maple leaf on the Flag of Canada has 11 points.
 The loonie is a hendecagon, an 11-sided polygon.
 Clocks depicted on Canadian currency, like the Canadian 50-dollar bill, show 11:00.

In other fields 
 Sector 11 in the North American Industry Classification System is the code for Agriculture, Forestry, Fishing and Hunting industries.
 Being one hour before 12:00, the eleventh hour means the last possible moment to take care of something, and often implies a situation of urgent danger or emergency (see Doomsday clock).
 English-speaking surveyors have developed several slang terms for 11 to distinguish it from its rhyme "seven", including "punk," "top," & "railroad".
American Airlines Flight 11, a Boston-Los Angeles flight, crashed into the North Tower of the World Trade Center in New York City after terrorists hijacked it on September 11, 2001.
 The number 11 bus is a low-cost way to sightsee in London.
 In the game of blackjack, an ace can count as either one or 11, whichever is more advantageous for the player.
 11 is the number of the French department Aude.
 Three films – Ben-Hur (1959), Titanic (1997), and The Lord of the Rings: The Return of the King (2003) – have each won 11 Academy Awards, including Best Picture.
 Ocean's Eleven is the name of two American films.
 In the anime series Code Geass, Japan is known as Area 11 of the Brittanian Empire.
 Eleven is the name of a character in the 2016 Netflix original series Stranger Things, portrayed by Millie Bobby Brown.
 Eleven is a British television production company.

See also
11:11
11:11 (numerology)
XI

References

External links

 

 
Integers